The 1984 Cronulla-Sutherland Sharks season was the eighteenth in the club's history. They competed in the NSWRFL's 1984 Winfield Cup premiership as well as the 1984 National Panasonic Cup.

Ladder

References

Cronulla-Sutherland Sharks seasons
Cronulla-Sutherland Sharks season